Enrique Gayoso Magalona Jr. (January 22, 1922 – April 7, 1998), popularly known as Pancho Magalona, was a Filipino actor from the 1940s to the 1970s.

Early life
Born Enrique Gayoso Magalona Jr. in Bacolod, Negros Occidental, he was the son of Enrique B. Magalona Sr., who was then a municipal president of Saravia (now renamed in his honor) and a future Senator.

Personal life
Magalona and his wife Tita Duran, appeared in numerous Sampaguita Pictures movies. The couple was the most popular movie love team during the late 1940s and 1950s. He was the father of Francis Magalona (1964–2009), Ma. Susan Magalona-Contreras, Vicky, Victor (married to Ma. Angeles), Henry, Popeye "Pye", Malot, Maricar Magalona-Martinez, and Martin. He also co-starred on some Hollywood movies that were shot in the Philippines, such as The Hook (with Kirk Douglas) and Merrill's Marauders (with Jeff Chandler).

Awards
He won the FAMAS Award for Best Actor in 1958 for Hanggang sa Dulo ng Daigdig and is best remembered for playing the character Simon in the movie version of Jose Rizal's novel El Filibusterismo.

Death
A heavy smoker, he suffered from emphysema and died at the Lung Center of the Philippines on April 10, 1998. He was buried in Loyola Memorial Park, Sucat, Parañaque beside his wife Tita Duran.

Filmography

Makislap na Bato (1947)
Maharlika (1948)
Bulaklak na Walang Pangalan (1948)
Tatlong Puso (1948)
Simpatika (1949)
Ang Doktora (1949)
Always Kay Ganda Mo (1949)
Apoy sa Langit (1949)
Milagro ng Birhen ng Mga Rosas (1949)
Huwag Ka ng Magtampo (1950)
Mapuputing kamay (1950)
Huling Patak ng Dugo (1950)
Campo O' Donnell (1950)
Kay Ganda Mo Neneng (1950)
Umaga ng Neneng (1950)
Kasintahan sa Pangarap (1951)
Barbaro (1952)
Lihim ng Kumpisalan (1952)
Buhay Pilipino (1952)
Basahang Ginto (1952) - Danny
Kasaysayan ni Rudy Concepcion (1952) - Rudy Concepcion
Teksas, ang Manok Na Nagsasalita (1952, English title: Texas)
Sabas, ang Barbaro (1952)
Musikong Bumbong (1953)
Sa Isang Sulyap Mo Tita (1953) - Tony
Maldita (1953)
Vod-a-vil (1953)
Ang Ating Pag-ibig (1953)
Milyonarya at Hampaslupa (1954)
Sa Isang Halik Mo Pancho (1954) - Pancho
Menor de Edad (1954)
Bulaklak sa Parang (1955)
Sa Dulo ng Landas (1955)
Waldas (1955)
Maria Went to Town (1955)
Lola Sinderella (1955)
Apat na Kasaysayang Ginto (1956) - First segment -"Ngayon at Kailan Man"
Margarita (1956)
Bella Filipina (1956)
The Treasure of Gen. Yamashita (1956)
Mr. & Mrs. (1956)
Rockin' the Cha-Cha (1956)
Bicol Express (1957) - (Third Segment)
Pabo Real (1957)
Cavalry Command (1958, a.k.a. The Day of the Trumpet) - Captain Magno Maxalla
Be My Love (1958)
Glory at Dawn (1958)
Azimat (1958, a.k.a. The Seal of Solomon) Malay Film Production Singapore
Hanggang sa Dulo ng Daigdig (1958)
Cry Freedom (1959) - Marking
Tayo'y Magsaya (1959)
Navy Blues (1960)
Emily (1960)
Tres Mosqueteros (1960) - D'Artagnan
Luis Latigo (1961)
Jikiri (1962)
El filibusterismo (1962) - Simoun / Crisostomo Ibarra
Merrill's Marauders (1962) - Taggy
The Hook (1963, cast as Enrique Magalona in MGM film.) - Kim a.k.a. The Gook
Isinusumpa Ko! (1963)
Mr. Melody (1963)
A Yank in Viet-Nam (1964) - Andre
Dugo ng Sugatan (1964)
Pancho Loves Tita (1964, TV Series) - Pancho
Moro Witch Doctor (1964) - Martin Gonzaga
Surabaya Conspiracy (1969, a.k.a. The Gold Seekers, USA TV title) - Captain Haryan
Pipo (1970, a.k.a. A Time for Dying) - Capt. Furuda
Sakada (1976, a.k.a. The Tenants) - Don Manuel
Bitayin si Baby Ama! (1976)
50% Down (1977)
Bundok ng Susong Dalaga (1983) - (final film role)

References

External links

1923 births
1998 deaths
Respiratory disease deaths in the Philippines
Male actors from Negros Occidental
Pancho
20th-century Filipino male actors
Deaths from emphysema